David Barnhill (October 30, 1914 – January 8, 1983) was an American Negro league baseball pitcher. Barnhill played from 1937 to 1949, mostly with the New York Cubans. He also played for the New York Giants in the minor leagues from 1949 to 1953, in the American Association and the Florida International League.

Notes

References

Further reading

 Riley, James A. (2014). Of Monarchs and Black Barons: Essays on Baseball's Negro Leagues. Jefferson, NC: McFarland & Company. pp 170–174. .

External links
 and Seamheads 
Negro League Baseball Players Association page

1914 births
1983 deaths
Ethiopian Clowns players
New York Cubans players
Minneapolis Millers (baseball) players
Miami Beach Flamingos players
Fort Lauderdale Lions players
Baseball players from North Carolina
20th-century African-American sportspeople
Baseball pitchers